Kenneth Oppel (born August 31, 1967) is a Canadian children's writer.

Biography
Oppel was born in Port Alberni, and spent his childhood in Victoria, British Columbia and Halifax, Nova Scotia. He also lived in Newfoundland and Labrador, England, and Ireland.

In 1985, Oppel wrote his first book Colin's Fantastic Video Adventure, while at St. Michaels University School. He attended at the same time as actors Andrew Sabiston and Leslie Hope, fellow writers John Burns and Bert Archer, and just before the NBA's Steve Nash and Flickr founder Stewart Butterfield. Oppel forwarded the newly completed manuscript to a family friend who knew Roald Dahl, who in turn recommended it to his agent. Oppel went on to receive his Bachelor of Arts degree in cinema studies and English at Trinity College in the University of Toronto, writing The Live-Forever Machine (1992) during his final year. Oppel moved to England and wrote a number of books during that period, gleaning several ideas while working at typing students' papers. From 1995 to 1996, Oppel worked as an editor at Quill & Quire, the trade magazine of the Canadian publishing industry.

He wrote four books for the Silverwing novel series: Silverwing, Sunwing, Firewing and Darkwing. He also wrote another series, the Matt Cruse saga, including Airborn (2004), Skybreaker (2005) and Starclimber (2008).

Oppel won numerous literary awards, including the 2004 Governor General's Literary Award for English language children's literature, a Printz Honor Award from the American Library Association (both for Airborn) and The Times Children's Novel of 2005 (for Skybreaker, named a 2006 Best Book for Young Adults by the American Library Association).

Oppel married Philippa Sheppard, a Shakespeare Scholar and Instructor at the University of Toronto. They now live in Toronto with three children, Sophia, Nate and Julia.

Selected works

Young adult fiction
Half Brother (2011)
The Boundless (2014)
The Nest (2015)
Every Hidden Thing (2016)
Ghostlight (2022)

The Apprenticeship of Victor Frankenstein
This Dark Endeavor (2011)
Such Wicked Intent (2012)

Silverwing series

Silverwing (1997)
Sunwing (1999)
Firewing (2002)
Darkwing (2007); UK title, Dusk – prequel to the trilogy

Airborn series
Airborn (2004)
Skybreaker (2005)
Starclimber (2008)

Overthrow series
Bloom (2020)
Hatch (2020)
Thrive (2021)

Other
The Live-Forever Machine (1990)
Dead Water Zone (1992)

Children's fiction

Barnes and the Brains
A Bad Case of Ghosts (1993)
A Strange Case of Magic (1994), or A Bad Case of Magic
A Crazy Case of Robots (1994), or A Bad Case of Robots
An Incredible Case of Dinosaurs (1994), or A Bad Case of Dinosaurs
A Weird Case of Super-Goo (1997), or A Bad Case of Super-Goo
A Creepy Case of Vampires (2002)

Other
 Colin's Fantastic Video Adventure (E. P. Dutton, 1985)
Cosmos Cat (1990)
Follow That Star (1992)
Cosmic Snapshots (1993)
Galactic Snapshots (1993)
Emma's Emu (1995)
Peg and the Whale (2000)
Peg and the Yeti (2004)
The King's Taster (2009)

Adult fiction
The Devil's Cure (2000)

References

Other sources  
 CM magazine profile of Oppel, incorporating material from a 1996 interview
Interview by ACHUKA's Canadian Correspondent, Andrea Deakin (2000)
 Kenneth Oppel at CANSCAIP Members (archived 2010-10-17), with short autobiography
Red Cedar Awards Profile

External links
 
 
 

1967 births
Living people
Canadian children's writers
Canadian fantasy writers
Canadian male novelists
Canadian science fiction writers
Governor General's Award-winning children's writers
Steampunk writers
People from Port Alberni
Trinity College (Canada) alumni
University of Toronto alumni
Writers from British Columbia